System Shock is an upcoming action-adventure game developed by Nightdive Studios and published by Prime Matter. It is a remake of the 1994 video game of the same name, originally developed by Looking Glass Studios. The game is set to be released in May 2023 for Windows, followed by ports for Linux, macOS, the PlayStation 4, PlayStation 5, Xbox One, and Xbox Series X/S.

Development 
The original System Shock, released in 1994, was developed by Looking Glass Studios, which closed in 2000. The company assets, including the rights to System Shock, were acquired by Star Insurance Company, a subsidiary of Meadowbrook Insurance Group. In 2012, Nightdive Studios acquired the rights for System Shock 2 and produced a digitally distributable version updated for modern operating systems. Nightdive Studios subsequently went on to acquire the rights for System Shock and the franchise as a whole.

Two months after the release of System Shock: Enhanced Edition in September 2015, Nightdive Studios announced plans to develop a remake of System Shock for Windows and Xbox One using the Unity engine. Originally announced as System Shock Remastered, Nightdive Studios has opted to simply name the new game System Shock, because they consider the level of effort put into the title makes it more of a reboot of the franchise rather than a remastering of the original game. Veteran designer Chris Avellone and members of the Fallout: New Vegas development team have confirmed their involvement.

Alongside the Kickstarter campaign, the studio released a free demo featuring an early build of the first level of the game, exhibiting their efforts so far on the project and intended to "demonstrate [their] commitment and passion" to faithfully rebooting the game. The Kickstarter goal was met on July 9, 2016 with 19 days left in its campaign, and closed on July 28, 2016 with more than $1.35M in funding from about 21,600 backers. The additional funding was to be used towards Linux and macOS versions of the game, expanded areas, and support for the Razer Chroma. With the successful Kickstarter, Nightdive Studios anticipated a December 2017 release for the game.

During the Kickstarter period, Nightdive Studios saw that there was a considerable demand for a PlayStation 4 version of the title. They subsequently talked with Sony and were able to affirm that a PlayStation 4 version would be possible. The studio planned to release this version in early 2018. The addition of the PlayStation 4 port did not impact the Kickstarter funding request, as the studio believed it could complete this with the $900,000 sought. After breaking the  mark on Kickstarter, ports for Linux and macOS were confirmed.

During the 2017 Game Developers Conference, Nightdive Studios announced they would move development from Unity to Unreal Engine 4, with director Jason Fader saying "Unity is not a great engine to use if you want to make an FPS on console". Fader cited issues related to a combination of fidelity, cross-platform support, content pipelines and performance issues as the reason for the switch. Fader also clarified that they now considered the game a more "faithful reboot" than a remaster; the game's story, character, weapons, levels, and enemies remained as in the original game, but they were applying "modern design principles" to rework some of these and add in others to make the game more playable for current audiences. Fader offered one example in level design, calling the original System Shocks maps a "product of the time" which did not age well; while somewhat fixed to the level's layout, the team was able to open up some areas and remove unnecessary mazes to make the game more interesting for players. Fader offered that while the story remains beat-for-beat, the team had added Chris Avellone to change some of the dialog and to fix some of the plot holes from the original game.

In mid-February 2018, Nightdive announced that development of System Shock was put on hold. CEO Stephen Kick stated "I have put the team on a hiatus while we reassess our path so that we can return to our vision. We are taking a break, but not ending the project. System Shock is going to be completed and all of our promises fulfilled." Kick explained that as the project had shifted from a remake to a reboot, they "strayed" from the core concepts of the original game, and found they needed a larger budget. Nightdive's director of business development Larry Kuperman said they had approached publishing partners to fund the expanded effort, but could not obtain this additional support. Kick opted to put the project on hold, reassigning the team to other projects in the interim. Speaking at the Game Developers Conference in March 2018, Kick and Kuperman explained that because of the feature creep, a newly assembled team had restarted the game's development, staying focused on the promises of what they would deliver during the Kickstarter, and that they were now looking towards a 2020 release. The refocusing of the game also helped them to engage with interested publishing partners who were more amenable to supporting them.

In May 2020, Nightdive released an alpha demo of the game via GOG and Steam, along with a developer's walkthrough and commentary to accompany the release. The demo featured a new build of the game from that of previously released demos; however, it still featured voiceover audio which Nightdive had yet to re-record due to delays caused by the COVID-19 pandemic. Following Chinese developer Tencent's acquisition of the rights to System Shock 3 from OtherSide Entertainment, Nightdive also clarified that Tencent had only acquired the rights to make sequels in the series; therefore not impacting the status of the remake.

In June 2020, when asked if Chris Avellone was still involved with the game after sexual misconduct allegations arose previously, CEO Stephen Kick revealed that Avellone had not been involved with the game since 2017 and that Nightdive had gone in a different direction with the game's writing after restarting development of the game in 2018.

With the release of an updated demo in February 2021, Nightdive stated they were planning a release date later in 2021. By late 2021, Nightdive announced that the game's release was pushed back into 2022, but they had partnered with the Prime Matter publishing label for the game's release. The game is set to be released for Windows via Steam, GOG.com, and Epic Games Store on May 30, 2023. Versions for Linux, macOS, the PlayStation 4, PlayStation 5, Xbox One, and Xbox Series X/S are planned.

References

External links 
 

Upcoming video games scheduled for 2023
Adventure games
Crowdfunded video games
Cyberpunk video games
Kickstarter-funded video games
Plaion
PlayStation 4 games
Single-player video games
System Shock
Video game remakes
Video games developed in the United States
Video games set in the 2070s
Video games about virtual reality
Windows games
Linux games
MacOS games
Xbox One games
Unreal Engine games
Immersive sims